Axungia is a kind of soft animal fat, usually from around the kidneys of geese or pigs, used in pre-modern western medicine.  It differs from lard, which is firm, and suet or adeps, which is dry.

The Ancient Romans distinguished fat into pinguedo or axungia, and adeps or sebum; but writers often interchange the terms.

In pre-modern medicine, physicians made use of the axungia of the goose, the dog, the viper, and some others, especially that of humans, considered of "extraordinary service in the drawing and ripening of tumors, etc." (see attrahent)

Etymology

From French axunge, adapted from Latin axungia 'axle grease' = axis 'axle' + ungere 'to grease'.

References

Notes

Animal fat products
Cooking fats
History of pharmacy